Thambiranpatty is a village in Velur panchyat of Perambalur district, Tamil Nadu, India.

Villages in Perambalur district